Steve Johnson and Sam Querrey were the defending champions, but lost in the quarterfinals to Juan Sebastián Cabal and Robert Farah.

Jean-Julien Rojer and Horia Tecău won the title, defeating Cabal and Farah in the final, 2–6, 7–6(11–9), [10–6].

Seeds

Draw

Draw

References
 Main Draw

Geneva Open - Doubles
2017 in Swiss sport
Doubles